This article refers to sports broadcasting contracts in Germany. For a list of contracts in other countries, see Sports television broadcast contracts.

Football
FIFA
FIFA World Cup
ARD (1954–2026), ZDF (1966–2026), RTL (2026) (broadcast respectively)
Magenta TV (2022-2026)

FIFA World Cup Qualifiers:
UEFA 
RTL (national team, 2016–2022) 
DAZN (all games, delayed matches for national team (2021–2022), 2016–2022)
 FIFA Women's World Cup
 ARD, ZDF
 DAZN (26 of 52  live matches, plus highlights of all other matches (include national team) in 2019)
 FIFA Club World Cup
 DAZN (2016–2021)

UEFA
UEFA European Championship
ARD (1960–2028), ZDF (1964–2028) (broadcast respectively)
Magenta TV (2021–2024)
RTL (2024–2028)
UEFA European Championship qualifiers
RTL (only national team, 2014–2028)
DAZN (all games live, delayed matches for national team, 2019–2028)
UEFA Nations League (2018–2028)
DAZN (all matches (exclude national team group fixtures), 2018–2028)
ARD (in 2018–19 aired last both pick national team group matches only, in 2020–21 aired the both October and a second November (last) pick matches (total three or four matches))
ZDF (three live matches (first both pick national team group matches, plus a final) in 2018–19, in 2020–21 aired the both September and a first November pick matches (total three or four matches))
RTL (national team matches, 2022–2028)
 UEFA European Under-21 Championship:
ProSiebenSat.1 Media
 UEFA Youth Championships : Sport1
 UEFA European Under-19 Championship
 UEFA Women's Under-19 Championship
 UEFA European Under-17 Championship
 UEFA Women's Under-17 Championship
UEFA Champions League
RTL (1994–1999, 2000–2003)
tm3 (1999–2000)
SKY (2000–2021)
Sat.1 (1 game on Wednesday, 2003–2012)
ZDF (1 game on Wednesday, 2012–2018, returned again from 2020–2024 but only broadcast a final match (include or exclude 2021 if the German clubs involved))
DAZN (all games, 2018–2024)
Amazon Prime Video (2021–2024)
UEFA Europa League
SKY (2000–2018)
ProSieben (1 game on Wednesday, 2007)
Sat.1 (1 game on Wednesday, 2007–2012)
kabel eins (1 game live, 2010–2015)
Sport1 (1 game live, 2015–2018)
RTL (1 game live on free-TV in 2018–2024, all games exclusively live from 2021–2024)
DAZN (all games, 2018–2021)
UEFA Europa Conference League
RTL (all games exclusively live from 2021–2024 with 1 game live on free-TV)
UEFA Super Cup
SKY (2000–2020)
DAZN (2018–2020)
Amazon Prime Video (2021–2023)
 UEFA Youth League (2015–2021)
 Sport1
 UEFA Women's Champions League
 Sport1 (selected matches, exclude final until 2017 and include final from 2018–2021)
 Eurosport (selected matches, include final until 2017 and exclude final from 2017–18)
 DAZN (2021-2025)

AFC
National teams
2023 AFC Asian Cup: Sportdigital
AFC Futsal Championship: Sportdigital (2022 and 2024)
AFC Junior/Youth Championships: Sportdigital (until 2024)
U-23
U-20 (futsal only)
U-19
U-16
Clubs
AFC Champions League: Sport1 (2021 and 2022)
AFC Cup: Sportdigital (until 2024)
AFC Futsal Club Championship: Sportdigital (until 2024)
CONMEBOL DAZN
Copa América
CONMEBOL Libertadores (through 2022)
CONMEBOL Sudamericana (through 2022)
Recopa Sudamericana (2020–2022)

CONCACAF
CONCACAF Gold Cup: DAZN
CONCACAF Champions League: Sportdigital (selected matches from quarter-finals) & YouTube (all matches)

National team
Germany national football team
ARD (both October and a second November (last) pick matches (in 2018 aired last two matches)), ZDF ((in 2018 aired first two matches)) (six UEFA Nations League matches only respectively (in 2018 only four matches), 2018–2021) both public broadcasters aired the friendly matches until the first half of 2018 (before World Cup finals)
 RTL Television (Qualifiers of FIFA World Cup and UEFA European Championship, 2014–2022, plus friendly matches, 2018–2022)
DAZN (delayed matches, 2019–2022)
Germany national under-21 football team:
ARD, ZDF (UEFA European Under-21 Championship finals matches respectively until 2019)
ProSieben and ProSieben Maxx (2021 and 2023 UEFA U-21 Championship qualifiers, plus all friendly matches, 2019–2023, from 2021 onwards including the finals tournament)

German competitions
Bundesliga: SKY (live broadcast of most games), DAZN (Friday and Monday Night Games, 5 Sunday Afternoon Games, plus highlights) ARD (Highlights), Sat.1 (9 games per season).
2. Bundesliga: SKY (live broadcast of all games), Sky Sport News & Sport1 (highlights on Friday & Sunday), DAZN (Highlights of other matches, plus live coverage of relegation play-offs) and ARD (highlights on Saturday)
Frauen-Bundesliga: Regional channels, Magenta Sport, Eurosport, and DFB-TV (until 2021–22)
DFB-Pokal: ARD and ZDF (including both semi-finals and a final), Sport1 (exclude semi-finals and a final) (one match per round respectively, total two matches, plus highlights of other matches), and SKY

Other leagues and cups
International Champions Cup: Sport1 (10 of 18 matches (including all German clubs)), OneFootball and DAZN (all matches)
Premier League: SKY (2019–2022)
FA Women's Super League: DAZN (2020–21 and 2021–22)
FA Cup: 
Eurosport (2015–2018) 
DAZN (2018–2024)
La Liga: DAZN (2016–2021)
Copa del Rey: Sportdigital (2022–2025)
Supercopa de España: Sportdigital (2023–2025)
Ligue 1: DAZN (2015–2021)
Coupe de la Ligue: DAZN (until 2020)
Coupe de France: DAZN
Trophée des Champions: DAZN
Eredivisie: Sportdigital & DAZN
Belgian Pro League: Sportdigital, DAZN, Sport1+ (2015–2025), OneFootball (2021-)
Portuguese Primeira Liga: Sportdigital & DAZN (2015–2018)
Scottish Premiership: Sportdigital, DAZN, Sport1+ (2015–2025)
Russian Football Premier League: Sportdigital (2022-present)
Argentine Primera División: 
DAZN & Sport 1+ (2015–2018)
Fanatiz (2019–present)
Campeonato Brasileiro Serie A:
DAZN & Sport 1+ (2015–2018)
Fanatiz (2020 & 2021)
A-League: Sportdigital & DAZN
Chinese Super League: Sportdigital & DAZN (2017–)
Israeli Premier League: ProSiebenSat.1 Media SE
K-League (2020–present): 
YouTube (one match per week, via COPA90)
ProSiebenSat.1 Media SE
Saudi Professional League
Sportdigital
Major League Soccer:
Eurosport (2015–2018)
DAZN (2019–2022)

American Football
National Football League
ProSieben Maxx (free-to-air, 2015-2023)
ProSieben (free-to-air, 2017-2023)
DAZN (subscription streaming, 2016-2026)
RTL (free-to-air, 2023-2028)
Nitro (free-to-air, 2023-2028)
RTL+ (subscription streaming, 2023-2028)
Super Bowl
ProSieben (free-to-air, 2018-2023)
RTL (free-to-air, since 2024)
DAZN (subscription streaming, since 2017) 
Pro Bowl
ProSieben Maxx (free-to-air, 2016-2023)
RTL (free-to-air, since 2024)
DAZN (subscription streaming, since 2017)
College football
ProSieben Maxx (free-to-air, since 2019)
DAZN (subscription streaming, since 2016)
XFL
ran.de (streaming, since 2020)
European League of Football
ProSieben Maxx (free-to-air, since 2021)
More Than Sports TV (free-to-air, since 2021)
German Football League
Sport 1 (free-to-air, since 2020)
German Bowl
Sport 1 (free-to-air, since 2018)
Eurobowl
Sport 1 (free-to-air, since 2018)

Basketball
Basketball Bundesliga: Telekom Basketball (all games), Sport 1 (1 game per week)
Euroleague: Telekom Basketball
NBA: DAZN, Telekom Basketball , Sport 1 US
German national team: Telekom Basketball (Qualifiers of FIBA Basketball World Cup, 2017-2019), Sport 1
FIBA World Championship: Sport 1
FIBA World Championship for Women: Sport 1
EuroBasket: ARD
College Basketball: Sport 1 US & DAZN

Boxing
Dream Boxing: DAZN, October 2022 to October 2025, all fights
Fights for Marco Huck: RTL Television
Matchroom Boxing: DAZN
Premier Boxing Champions: FITE TV and DAZN
Team Sauerland: ARD (until October 2014); ProSiebenSat.1 (October 2014 – 2017); Sport1 (since 2018)
Top Rank: FITE TV (if not involved the German boxers) and national/regional channels in Germany (if involved the German boxers)
World Boxing Super Series: Facebook and YouTube (quarter and semi finals in 2018-19 season), DAZN (2018–19 Super lightweight final only), and Bild (2018–20 Cruiserweight final only)

Cycling
Tour de France: ARD, Eurosport
Giro d'Italia: Eurosport
Vuelta a España: Eurosport
Tour de Suisse: Sport 1+
UCI Road World Championships: Eurosport
UCI ProTour: Eurosport

Field Hockey 

 FIH: DAZN (2019-2022)
 Men's Hockey World Cup (2018 and 2022)
 Women's Hockey World Cup (2018 and 2022)
 Men's Hockey Pro League (2019 and 2021)
 Women's Hockey Pro League (2019 and 2021)
 EuroHockey
Men's EuroHockey Championship: TBA (2021)
 Women's EuroHockey Championship: TBA (2021)
 Euro Hockey League: DAZN (2018–present)

Golf
Ryder Cup: SKY
European Tour: SKY, Sport 1
PGA Tour: SKY

Handball
World Men's Handball Championship: Sky (live in 2015 and Germany team news report in 2019), ARD and ZDF (Germany matches only, with highlights of all other matches respectively in 2019), Eurosport (15 matches live, exclude Germany team in 2019), Sportdeutschland.tv (all 96 matches exclusively live and free in 2019), RTL (non-Germany team news report in 2019), and Welt (Germany team news report only in 2019)
World Women's Handball Championship: Sport 1
EHF
Men's and Women's Euros (national teams) : ARD and ZDF (Germany matches only, respectively), Eurosport (all matches, exclude Germany team) (until 2024)
Club championships: DAZN (2020–21 until 2025–26)
Men's and Women's Champions Leagues
Men's and Women's European Leagues
Men's and Women's European Cups
Germany men's national handball team: Sport 1
Bundesliga: SKY
All Star Game: SKY 
DHB-Pokal: SKY
Supercup: SKY

Ice hockey
World Ice Hockey Championships:Sport 1
Deutsche Eishockey Liga: Telekom Eishockey (all games), Sport 1 (1 game per week)
National Hockey League: Prosieben Maxx (up to 18 Games), Sky Sport (Up to 300 Games) 
Champions Hockey League: Sport 1, DAZN, Laola 1
Kontinental Hockey League: sportdigital.tv

Kickboxing

Mixed martial arts

Motor racing
Formula One: SKY (until 2024), RTL and n-tv (1984-2022)
Formula Two: SKY
Formula Three: SKY
Formula E: ProSieben (2022–)
Extreme E: ProSieben Maxx (2021–)
World Rally Championship: DAZN
DTM: ProSieben (2022–)
Le Mans 24 Hours: Eurosport
American Le Mans Series: MotorsTV, Sport 1 (highlights)
Le Mans Series: Eurosport, MotorsTV
IndyCar Series: DAZN
Porsche Supercup: SKY, MotorsTV (highlights)
Porsche Carrera Cup: SKY
Formula 3 Euroseries: SKY, Sport 1
Formula BMW Europe: SKY
Seat Leon Supercopa: SKY
ADAC VW Polo Cup: SKY
World Touring Car Championship: Eurosport
Seat Leon Eurocup: Eurosport
NASCAR: Motorvision TV
MotoGP: DAZN
Superbike World Championship: Eurosport
24 Hours Nürburgring: RTL Nitro (2016-2024)

Multi-discipline events
Olympic Games: ARD, ZDF & Eurosport (2018-2024)
Paralympic Games: ARD, ZDF & Eurosport; Eurosport (2018-2024)
World Athletics Championships: ARD, ZDF & Eurosport
European Athletics Championships: ARD, ZDF & Eurosport
European Cup: ARD, ZDF & Eurosport
European Games: Sport1

Rugby Union
Rugby World Cup: ProSieben MAXX (2019)
World Rugby Sevens Series: ProSieben MAXX (since 2019-20 season)
Six Nations Championship: ProSieben MAXX (since 2020), DAZN (since 2017)
Pro14: DAZN (2018-2021) 
European Rugby Champions Cup: DAZN (2018-2022) 
European Rugby Challenge Cup: DAZN (2018-2022)
Autumn rugby union internationals: DAZN (since 2016)

Rugby League
Rugby League World Cup: ProSieben MAXX (TV, 2017), Sportdeutschland.TV (Stream, 2017)
NRL: SPORT1+ (2022, 3 games per week)

Sailing
America's Cup: Servus TV
Louis Vuitton Cup: Servus TV

Winter Sports
Alpine Skiing World Cup: ARD/ZDF, Eurosport
Biathlon World Cup: ARD/ZDF, Eurosport
Ski jumping World Cup: ARD/ZDF, Eurosport
FIS Nordic Combined World Cup: ARD/ZDF, Eurosport
FIS Cross-Country World Cup: ARD/ZDF, Eurosport
FIS Freestyle Skiing World Cup: ARD/ZDF, Eurosport
FIS Snowboard World Cup: ARD/ZDF, Eurosport
Luge World Cup: ARD/ZDF, Eurosport
Skeleton World Cup: ARD/ZDF
Bobsleigh World Cup: ARD/ZDF

Tennis
Wimbledon: SKY until 2022
Australian Open: Eurosport until 2021
French Open: Eurosport until 2021
U.S. Open: Eurosport  until 2022
ATP World Tour : SKY until 2023, DAZN for ATP 250 until 2019, ZDF (Gerry Weber Open) until 2019
WTA tour: DAZN
Davis Cup: DAZN
Fed Cup: Sportdeutschland.TV (free-streaming) (from 2020 qualifiers)

Volleyball
CEV Champions League: Sport 1
FIVB Volleyball Men's Nations League and FIVB Volleyball Women's Nations League: Sport1 (free-TV) and Sportdeutschland.tv (free-streaming) 
FIVB Men's and Women's World Championships: SKY (Pay-TV)  and Sportdeutschland.tv (free-streaming) (2018)

Beach Volleyball
European Beach Volleyball Championships: Sport1 (Free-TV, since 2018), Sport1+ (Pay-TV, since 2017)
Techniker Beach Tour: ProSieben Maxx (TV, 2018-2019), Sportdeutschland.TV (Stream, 2018-2019)
German Beach Volleyball Championships: ProSieben Maxx (TV, 2018-2019), Sportdeutschland.TV (Stream, 2018-2019)

Wrestling
WWE Monday Night RAW: ProSieben MAXX
WWE SmackDown!: ProSieben MAXX
WWE NXT: ProSieben Fun
All Elite Wrestling and AEW Dynamite: TNT Serie and Sky Select 
Lucha Underground: TNT Serie (2016–2019)

Miscellaneous
X Games: ProSieben Fun (2013-2021)
Street League Skateboarding: ProSieben Fun (2014, 2019-2020)
Dew Tour: ProSieben Fun (2014-2015, 2019-2021)
Darts: 
DAZN: PDC televised tournaments, PDC European Tour
Sport1: some PDC televised tournaments, WSDC Senior darts
Eurosport: WDF televised tournaments

References

Germany
Television in Germany